A slave catcher was a person employed to track down and return escaped slaves to their enslavers.  Slave catchers were active in Brazil, both during the period it was a Portuguese colony and after it became an independent nation. Unlike in North America, indigenous Brazilians occasionally became slave catchers as well. Escaped slaves in Brazil formed quilombos, which slave catchers frequently raided, resulting in most of them becoming abandoned or destroyed. The institution of slave catching in Brazil similarly disappeared after the passage of the Lei Áurea by the Brazilian General Assembly in 1888, which abolished slavery in the country.

See also
Slave catcher
Slave patrol
Slave pen

References

Law enforcement in Brazil
Slavery in Brazil
Obsolete occupations
Defunct law enforcement agencies